Menchum, or Befang, is a Grassfields language of Cameroon.

Befang is the local town and also the name of the Menchum dialect spoken there.

References

Grassfields Bantu languages
Languages of Cameroon